Persuader is a Swedish power metal band that was formed in 1997.

Persuader may also refer to:

 Persuader (comics), three DC Comics supervillains
 Persuader (novel), a 2003 thriller novel
 Mossberg 500 (Mossberg Persuader), a line of shotguns produced by O.F. Mossberg & Sons
 The Persuader (album), a 1985 album by Debbie Byrne
 The Persuader (film), a 1957 American Western film

See also
 The Persuaders (disambiguation)